The men's cruiserweight (86 kg/189.2 lbs) Full-Contact category at the W.A.K.O. European Championships 2004 in Budva was the third heaviest of the male Full-Contact tournaments and involved just six participants.  Each of the matches was three rounds of two minutes each and were fought under Full-Contact kickboxing rules.

Due to the low level of contestants two of the men received a bye through to the semi finals.  The gold medal winner was host nation Serbia and Montenegro's Slobodan Marinkovic who defeated Robert Paulsbyen from Norway in the final by split decision after three rounds.  Gamzat Isalmagomedov from Russia and Piotr Walczak from Poland gained bronze medals.

Results

Key

See also
List of WAKO Amateur European Championships
List of WAKO Amateur World Championships
List of male kickboxers

References

External links
 WAKO World Association of Kickboxing Organizations Official Site

W.A.K.O. European Championships 2004 (Budva)